The Central District of Tabriz County is in East Azerbaijan province, Iran. At the National Census in 2006, its population was 1,521,239 in 414,499 households. The following census in 2011 counted 1,656,868 people in 502,004 households. At the latest census in 2016, the district had 1,724,369 inhabitants in 548,605 households.

In 2021, Meydan Chay Rural District and the city of Basmenj were separated from the district to establish Basmenj District. At the same time, Mehranrud Rural District was established in the Central District from parts of Esperan Rural District.

References 

Tabriz County

Districts of East Azerbaijan Province

Populated places in East Azerbaijan Province

Populated places in Tabriz County